Lembit Kolk (born Vassil Kolk; 5 October 1907, Muhu – 13 April 2003, Toronto, Canada) was an Estonian politician. He was a member of Estonian National Assembly.

In 1944, during World War II and the Soviet occupation of Estonia, the Kolk family fled to Sweden, and Kolk was later a member of the board of the Central Council of Estonians in Toronto, Canada.

References

1907 births
Year of death missing
Members of the Estonian National Assembly
Estonian World War II refugees
Estonian emigrants to Canada
People from Muhu Parish